"Stand Up (Kick Love into Motion)" is a 1993 single by English hard rock band Def Leppard from their multi-platinum album Adrenalize. The song reached No. 1 on the Billboard Album Rock charts, and #34 on the Billboard Hot 100. This was the fourth single from the Adrenalize album.

Background
Phil Collen, according to a statement on the Rock of Ages and Best Of compilations albums, says that this song was written  at Wisseloord Studios while Def Leppard was recording the album Hysteria. It was written by Collen and Steve Clark. This song was not included on Hysteria, since the band thought it was very similar to the song "Hysteria".

Video
The music video was directed by Matt Mahurin, and features Def Leppard managers Peter Mensch and Cliff Burnstein as a business man and baseball player, respectively. Filming took place on 26 October 1992. The outdoors footage was captured near Central Park in New York City.

A censored version blurs the naked couple on the close up scene.

The video peaked at number 3 on the US MTV Top 20 Countdown.

Track listing

CD: Bludgeon Riffola / 862 027-2 (AUSTRALIA) / Limited Edition Digipak 
 "Stand Up (Kick Love into Motion)"
 "She's Too Tough"
 "Elected" (Live) (Alice Cooper cover)
 "Let's Get Rocked" (Live)

Charts

Weekly charts

Year-end charts

References

External links

Def Leppard songs
1993 singles
Songs written by Robert John "Mutt" Lange
1992 songs
Songs written by Steve Clark
Songs written by Phil Collen
Songs written by Joe Elliott
Mercury Records singles
Rock ballads
British pop rock songs